This page lists all railway stations in Wellington, New Zealand that are or were on Wellington's suburban passenger rail network. Ownership of all station buildings except Wellington was transferred to Greater Wellington Regional Council on 1 July 2011. Wellington Station is owned by KiwiRail, along with all station platforms and other railway network infrastructure. All stations have platforms, the majority of which were designed to accommodate 9-car DM/D EMUs. Exceptions to this include the Wairarapa stations, which have platforms long enough for either 3 or 7 car sets of SW-class carriages; and those on the Johnsonville Line, which have platforms designed for 6-car Matangi sets. Most stations in the suburban network have been upgraded to accommodate the "Matangi" electric units which were introduced from 2010. The train services are run by Transdev Wellington.

Maps

Schematic map

Geographic map

List

Current stations

Former stations

Notes 
Stations
Parkside until 1964. Never used for passenger traffic.
Renamed Manor Park when the Hutt Valley Branch became the main line.
Demolished in 1938.
Was known as Dolly Varden (after a ship) until 1960 when local pressure resulted in the area being renamed Mana.
With the closure of the Western Hutt section of the Wairarapa Line and the formation of the Melling Branch from the remainder, Melling station was relocated to the south side of the Melling Link road.
Replaced by Andrews, to the south.
Originally Pukerua.
Thought to have been reopened during WW II to serve the nearby hospital. On or near the site of the Silver Stream Railway's McKirdy station.
Near Mackays Crossing.
On closure relocated and later named Lambton.
Originally Lower Hutt.
Dates
 A date with a question mark means the date is from an ambiguous source or sources.
 – in the Closed column means the station is still open.
 ? without a date means that the date is not known, but the station has definitely been opened/closed.

Proposals
The GWRC 2009 Long Term Community Plan (LTCCP) indicates that it is considering introducing user-pays charges to some station carparks where demand exceeds supply. Some stations are being considered for expanded parking facilities where sufficient demand exists and suitable land is available, but necessary station upgrades to accommodate new rolling stock have constrained the amount of funding that can be committed to projects like improved Park-and-Ride facilities.

There are several proposals for new stations to be built along existing lines.

Kapiti Line 
GWRC's Western Corridor Plan calls for improvements to rail services in the Kapiti area, including two new stations: Raumati, proposed for completion in 2009, south of Paraparaumu, probably just north of the intersection of State Highway 1 and Poplar Avenue; and Lindale, proposed for completion in 2010, would be part of a larger transport hub north of Paraparaumu. However, a more recent decision by the council to invest its funds and resources in electrification and double-tracking to Waikanae, and the upgrade of Paraparaumu and Waikanae stations, has meant that consideration will now not be given to these new stations before 2010. GWRC's passenger transport committee has also recommended that electrification be extended to Waikanae, bringing the existing station there into the Wellington rail network – although the Western Corridor Plan did not envisage this occurring within the next 20 years, work was completed in February 2011.

The following stations have also been proposed, but not approved:
between Porirua and Paremata, to serve the new Aotea development; 
south of Takapu Road, to serve Glenside and other expanding residential areas near Johnsonville; 
at Mackays Crossing, between Paekakariki and Raumati (near the site of the former Wainui station); 
in Tawa No 2 tunnel, to serve Newlands.

There have also been proposals to close either Redwood or Takapu Road, and either Pukerua Bay or Muri, to reduce transit times by reducing the number of stops. The suggestions were not included in the Plan, but Muri station was closed on 30 April 2011.

Hutt Valley Line
Greater Wellington's Hutt Corridor Plan calls for it to "[d]esign and implement extension of electrification and services northward beyond Upper Hutt, including new stations at Timberlea and Cruickshank Road." These stations are not planned for construction until after 2016. A branch line to Wainuiomata has been proposed as recently as the 1970s, but is not planned.

References

Bibliography 
 
  
 
 
 
  
 
  
 

 Rail transport in Wellington
Railway stations
Wellington